Acer pauciflorum is an Asian species of maple in the family Sapindaceae. It has been found only in the Provinces of Anhui and Zhejiang in eastern China.

Acer pauciflorum is a multi-stemmed tree up to 15 meters tall. Leaves are up to 55 mm across, deeply cut into lobes, each leaf usually with 5 lobes but occasionally 7. Leaves are dark green on top but covered with white wool on the underside.

References

pauciflorum
Flora of Anhui
Flora of Zhejiang
Plants described in 1932